The Institute of National Museums of Rwanda (INMRB) is a governmental organization in Rwanda.

It was started as an ethnographic museum in September 1989, consisting only of the National Museum of Rwanda in Butare, but it now contains the:

 Ethnographic Museum

 Kandt House Museum of Natural History
 Museum of Rwesero
 King's Palace Museum
 Rwanda Art Museum
 Museum of Environment
 National Liberation Museum Park
 Museum for Campaign Against Genocide

See also 

 List of museums in Rwanda

References 

Museums in Africa
Museums in Rwanda